Grammitis wattsii  is a fern in the  family Polypodiaceae. The specific epithet honours the Reverend W. W. Watts (1856–1920), a prominent Australian cryptogamist active in the late 19th and early 20th centuries.

Description
The plant is an epiphytic fern. It has an erect or shortly creeping rhizome with dense, chestnut brown, narrow pointed scales. Its simple fronds combine a 0.5–5 cm long stipe with a narrowly elliptic-linear lamina 5–20 cm long and 0.4–1.2 cm wide.

Distribution and habitat
The fern is endemic to Australia’s subtropical Lord Howe Island in the Tasman Sea; it is confined to the cloud forest on the upper slopes and summits of Mounts Lidgbird and Gower.

References

wattsii
Epiphytes
Endemic flora of Lord Howe Island
Plants described in 1942
Ferns of Australia
Taxa named by Edwin Copeland